Raw meat is meat that has not been cooked.

Raw Meat may refer to:
 Death Line, distributed in the US as Raw Meat, a horror film
 Raw Meat (EP),  an album by American rock band Meat Puppets